Ray Hodgson is a former association football player who represented New Zealand at international level.

Hodgson made four official appearances for the All Whites, all against Australia, the first a 0–6 loss on 14 August and his fourth and final appearance a 1–8 loss less than a month later on 11 September 1948.

References 

Year of birth missing (living people)
Living people
New Zealand association footballers
New Zealand international footballers
Association footballers not categorized by position